C. migratorius may refer to:
 Coregonus migratorius, a whitefish species
 Cricetulus migratorius, a rodent species

See also
 Migratorius